Túkiti, crecí de una is a Venezuelan telenovela created by Ricardo Hernández Anzola for RCTV, and it that originally aired on Venezuelan broadcast channel RCTV from August 16, 2006 to January 23, 2007. It stars Dexiree Bandes, María Gabriela de Faría, Gabriel Mantilla, Eugenio Keller, Laura Chimaras, and José Ramón Barreto.

Plot 
Antonio (Eugenio Keller) is a 15-year-old boy who has problems at school and with girls his age, lives only with his mother Mildred (Dexiree Bandes) a single working woman and his little brother Pipo (Gabriel Mantilla) Who feels that his brother dominates him, his father had abandoned them for several years, when his brother's nanny can no longer take charge, his mother to punish him (for being rejected) decides that now he will be the one to watch every afternoon.

Wendy (María Gabriela de Faría) is one of Antonio's best friends, along with Jefferson (José Ramón Barreto), all three live in the same building, Wendy is deeply in love with Antonio but is unable to confess, Antonio only sees her As a 'friend' more and not as a couple.

Antonio and Jefferson are dazzled by the most beautiful girl of their school popular Amaranta (Laura Chimaras), but she already has a partner (Danny) so they will look for love in different places, but Antonio finally realizes that it is also In love with Wendy, with whom he finally ends up staying. Jefferson also manages to stay with Amaranta after breaking his relationship with Danny, who dropped out of school.

Cast

Main 
 Dexiree Bandes as Mildred
 María Gabriela de Faría as Wendy
 Gabriel Mantilla as Pipo
 Eugenio Keller as Antonio
 Laura Chimaras as Amaranta
 José Ramón Barreto as Jefferson

Recurring 

 Manuel Colmenares as Puro Cuento
 Francis Romero as Benigna
 Anastasia Stoliarova as Eva
 Karen Pita as Marité
 Mayra Méndez as Dubriska
 René Díaz as Dani
 Roberto de Blassi as Fernando
 Verónica Cortéz as Ivana
 Amado Zambrano as "Aceite de Motor"
 Vito Lonardo as Camacaro
 Jesús Seijas as Malanga
 Hernán Marcano as Cristóbal
 Armando Quintero as Don Pepe
 Liliana Chechile as Marjorie
 Roberto Montemarani as Arrozcoicoechea
 Ricardo Guerrero as El Violinista

References

External links 
 

2006 telenovelas
Spanish-language telenovelas
Venezuelan telenovelas
RCTV telenovelas
2006 Venezuelan television series debuts
2007 Venezuelan television series endings
Television series about teenagers
Television shows set in Venezuela